Hamza Aït Ouamar (born December 6, 1986, in Algiers) is an Algerian football midfielder who last played for Jeddah.

Biography
In 2007, he was voted for the most promising young player in Algerian football along with Tayeb Berramla and Fulham's Hameur Bouazza. He played for Algeria in All Africa Games in 2007.

In 2008, he joined Finnish side Turun Palloseura, but as his old club CR Belouizdad was refusing to let him play for another team, he didn't get any league match appearances in TPS. Even though the transfer was finally accepted by FIFA.

On August 8, 2011, Aït Ouamar signed a one-year contract with CR Belouizdad, joining them on a free transfer from USM Alger. It will be his third stint with the club.

Honours
 Won the Algerian Cup once with CR Belouizdad in 2009

References

External links
Ligue 1/ES Sétif : Ait Ouamar nouvelle recrue estivale‚ aps.dz, 6 June 2016

1986 births
Algerian footballers
Kabyle people
Living people
Footballers from Algiers
Turun Palloseura footballers
USM Alger players
Terrassa FC footballers
CR Belouizdad players
MC Oran players
Al-Washm Club players
Al-Ansar FC (Medina) players
Jeddah Club players
Algerian Ligue Professionnelle 1 players
Saudi First Division League players
Algerian expatriate sportspeople in Finland
Algerian expatriate sportspeople in France
Algerian expatriate sportspeople in Spain
Algerian expatriate sportspeople in Saudi Arabia
Algeria under-23 international footballers
Expatriate footballers in Finland
Expatriate footballers in France
Expatriate footballers in Spain
Expatriate footballers in Saudi Arabia
Association football midfielders
21st-century Algerian people